Classic Fighters is a biennial airshow in Blenheim, New Zealand, held on the Easter weekend of odd-numbered years. The airshow has been running since 2001, and is held at Omaka Airfield, just outside the main town of Blenheim. Each year the air show is run with a different theme. Past themes have been a North African theme (complete with a pyramid and belly dancers) a France Theme with its Eiffel Tower, Arc de Triomphe, onion sellers and berets and also an ‘Aviation and the Movies’ theme, which opened the field wide for famous film scene recreations 2009 was for an Italian invasion. 2011 saw a focus on the second half of World War II.

Aircraft are displayed as part of a theatrical spectacle, where battle scenes and other historical events are re-enacted on the ground as well as in the air with an emphasis on World War I aircraft including as many as seven Fokker Dr.I triplanes of Jasta 11 during March 1918 well being led by the red Fokker Dr.I triplane of Manfred von Richthofen the Red Baron, as well as original Krupp artillery and World War I tanks.

A unique spectacle for the 2011 show was the launch of a life sized V-2 rocket replica.

The 2013 airshow featured the launch and destruction of a replica Bachem Natter rocket aircraft.

Aircraft on show have included:
World War I
Airco DH.5
Albatros D.Va
Avro 504k
Fokker D.VII
Fokker Dr.I
Halberstadt D.III
Pfalz D.III
Nieuport 11
Royal Aircraft Factory B.E.2
Sopwith Pup
Sopwith Camel

World War II
Avro Anson
Messerschmitt Bf 108
P-40 Kittyhawk
P-51 Mustang
F4U Corsair
C-47 Skytrain
Supermarine Spitfire
Focke Wulf 190 (Replica)
Yakovlev Yak-3

As well as many more aircraft, military vehicles and re-enactors from the Military Reenactment Society and other New Zealand reenactment groups,

The 2009 air show was held on the 10–12 April with an Italian Theme. On even-numbered years, the Warbirds over Wanaka event is held in Wanaka, also in the South Island.

Due to concerns about the COVID-19 pandemic on 10 March 2021 that year's event, originally scheduled for 2–4 April, was postponed to 3–5 September, the first time the event had been rescheduled.

References 

Air shows in New Zealand
Marlborough Region
Recurring events established in 2003
Autumn events in New Zealand